Roza Eva Maria Sage (born 25 November 1957), an Australian politician, was a member of the New South Wales Legislative Assembly representing the Blue Mountains for the Liberal Party from 2011 to 2015.

Early years and background
Completing her undergraduate studies in dentistry at the University of Queensland, in 1979 Sage joined the Royal Australian Air Force and was initially posted to RAAF Richmond and later transferred to RAAF Glenbrook in the lower Blue Mountains in 1982. Sage left the armed forces in 1986 to start a family and later commenced working in a private dental practice, before starting her own practice in 1988. The practice, located in Springwood, now employs seven people.

Political career
At the 2011 state election, Sage was elected with a swing of 16 points and won the seat with 54.7 per cent of the two-party vote. Following the retirement of the sitting member, Phil Koperberg. Sage is the first woman to represent the seat.

References

 

Liberal Party of Australia members of the Parliament of New South Wales
Members of the New South Wales Legislative Assembly
Living people
1957 births
University of Queensland alumni
Australian people of Hungarian descent
21st-century Australian politicians
Women members of the New South Wales Legislative Assembly
21st-century Australian women politicians